Conor O'Brien (born 30 May 1985) is an Irish hurler who played as a corner back for the Tipperary senior team from 2007 until 2016.

O'Brien made his first appearance for the team during the 2007 National League and has become a regular player over the last few seasons. During his playing career he has won one All-Ireland winners' medals, three Munster winners' medals, one National Hurling League winners' medal, one Munster Under-21 Hurling Championship medal, two Munster Minor Hurling Championship medals and two Fitzgibbon Cup medals.

At club level O'Brien is a one-time county intermediate championship medalist with Éire Óg Anacarty.

Playing career

Club

O’Brien plays his club hurling with his local Éire Óg Anacarty club and in 2006 captured a county intermediate championship with the club.

Minor, under-21 and intermediate

O'Brien first came to prominence on the inter-county scene as a member of the Tipperary minor hurling team in 2002. He won a Munster medal that year following a defeat of Cork in the provincial decider.

By 2006 O'Brien had joined the Tipperary under-21 team. A 3-11 to 0-13 defeat of Cork gave him a Munster medal in that grade. He later played in the All-Ireland showdown with Kilkenny. An exciting game resulted in a 2-14 apiece draw. Kilkenny narrowly won the replay by 1-11 to 0-11.

O'Brien also enjoyed an unsuccessful four seasons with the Tipperary intermediate hurling team.

Senior

O'Brien made his senior competitive debut for Tipperary in a National Hurling League game against Dublin in 2007, however, he remained on the periphery of the team for the remainder of the campaign.

In 2008 O'Brien became a regular member of the starting fifteen as Tipp remained undefeated in the National League before meeting Galway in the final.  In an exciting game Tipp emerged victorious by 3-18 to 3-16 and O'Brien collected his first National League winners' medal.  Tipperary later reached the Munster final where they defeated a resurgent Clare team by 2-21 to 0-19.  It was O'Brien's first Munster winners' medal. Tipperary were subsequently defeated in a tense All-Ireland semi-final by Waterford on a scoreline of 1-20 to 1-18. In spite of falling short in the championship, McGrath later collected his first All-Star award.

O'Brien won his second Munster medal in 2009 as Tipp defeated Waterford by 4-14 to 2-16. He played no further part in Tipperary's championship campaign.

After surrendering their Munster title to Cork at the first hurdle in 2010, Tipperray regrouped in the qualifiers and reached a second successive All-Ireland decider. Kilkenny, a team chasing a fifth successive championship, provided the opposition and a great game was expected.  Tipperary got off to a great start which was bolstered by an early Lar Corbett goal.  He subsequently completed a hat-trick of goals and Tipperary had a fourth by Noel McGrath to deny Kilkenny's drive-for-five and secure a remarkable and convincing 4-17 to 1-18 victory.  It was O'Brien's first All-Ireland medal.

After missing the 2011 championship, O'Brien returned to the starting fifteen again in 2012. In spite of an indifferent National League campaign, Tipperary were regarded as potential All-Ireland champions once again. A 2-17 to 0-16 defeat of Waterford in the provincial decider gave O'Brien a third Munster medal. Tipperary later faced a humiliating 4-24 to 1-15 defeat by eventual champions Kilkenny in the All-Ireland semi-final.

On 25 October 2016, O'Brien announced his retirement from inter-county hurling.
In a statement he said "Since I first joined the Tipperary senior hurling panel in 2007, I have always felt it a great privilege and honour to represent my county at senior level. Having enjoyed it immensely, I have decided that now is the time to announce my retirement".

Inter-provincial

O'Brien has also been a regular on the Munster team during various inter-provincial campaigns.

References

1985 births
Living people
Éire Óg Annacarty hurlers
Tipperary inter-county hurlers
Munster inter-provincial hurlers
All-Ireland Senior Hurling Championship winners